Filth is a comedy album by American comedian Andrew Dice Clay. It was originally released as a double album exclusively via the Internet in 1998, with only 20,000 copies produced.

A bonus third album of Filth, entitled Even More Filth, was included exclusively for pre-orders of the initial release.

Track listing
Disc 1

Cliff McGiver
Muffet Blews
Mancow
I Love My Fans
Joey Big Head
Midget Mania
Ball Bag Mania
Bun Pig
My Cum
Flat Fat Mania
Bongo Pussy
Ladies' Man
Hobbies, Golf & Twat
Crowd Pig
Rag Fun
Olympic Mania
Dice Revues Little House
My Kind of Girl
The Best Is Yet to Come

Disc 2: More Filth

He Said, She Said
Dice on Smoking
Chink Mania
Crowd Banter
Older, Younger
Money Management
Clinton Rules
Monicunt
Monicunt's Fatter Friend
Camel Jockey Mania
Greeting Cards
Wackbag House Remix 
Bird Mania
Florida Mania
More Crowd Banter
The Receptionist
Stone Cunt
Mother's Advice
Yet, More Crowd Banter
Dice on Comedy
Cheating & Hookers
Margot Mania
Walters Mania
Old Buddy

Disc 3: Even More Filth
 
Family Man
Little House Unplugged
Chucky
Extra President Stuff
Coffee Mania
Computer Nerd
Filthy
Dirty, Filthy, Nasty
Jim Norton
More Jim Norton
It's Just Sooooo Dirty
Bound, Tied & Fucked
Dice in Vegas

References

External links
AllMusic.com

Andrew Dice Clay albums
1998 live albums
1990s comedy albums
Live comedy albums
Spoken word albums by American artists